Heaven Has No Favorites is a novel by the German writer Erich Maria Remarque. This novel is a story about passion and love, set in 1948 with a background of automobile racing. Inspired by racing driver Alfonso de Portago.

The novel was serialized in the Hamburg magazine Kristall in 1959 under the title Borrowed Life, and first published in book form in 1961.

Plot summary
The main figure, Clerfayt, is an automobile racer who goes to a Swiss sanatorium to visit a fellow racer, Hollmann, who has tuberculosis. There he meets the young Belgian woman Lillian suffering from tuberculosis. She is in its terminal stage with no chance of a cure, and she wants to enjoy her last months rather than waiting for her death. She has been talking about leaving the hospital for months and has never gone through with it. This changes when a friend of hers dies in that hospital and she realizes that the corpses aren't named, they're given numbers and treated like cargo. Unwilling to become an unnamed body, she decides to leave the Bela Vista sanatorium with Clerfayt after having gone out with him the night before.

Together they travel over Europe, while Lillian indulges in lavish dresses and food, paid for by her uncle. Eventually they fall in love and Clerfayt starts to hope for a future with her. However, when he expresses his wish to settle down and wants to get her visited by a doctor, she internally realizes that marrying Clerfayt would be to make him a widower within months and refuses the idea. Although she loves him, she decides to leave him before they start an actual life together.
In one race, after the racer in front of him crashes,  Clerfayt is seriously injured and dies in the hospital. Lillian, devastated, returns to Switzerland. On her way there she encounters Hollmann, now healed, who has been offered the former job of Clerfayt. Six weeks later, Lillian dies. It is described as a peaceful moment, as if even the landscape had stopped breathing.

Film adaptation
Bobby Deerfield, a 1977 film based on the novel, starred Al Pacino as automobile racer Bobby Deerfield and Marthe Keller as Lillian Dunkerk.

References

1961 German novels
Novels by Erich Maria Remarque
Novels first published in serial form
Works originally published in German magazines
Novels set in Switzerland
German novels adapted into films
Novels set in the 1940s
Fiction set in 1948